Balla Unionis a union of Kalihati Upazila, Tangail District, Bangladesh. It is situated 12 km northeast of Tangail, the district headquarters.

Demographics
According to Population Census 2011 performed by Bangladesh Bureau of Statistics, The total population of Balla union is 42999. There are 10068 households in total.

Education
The literacy rate of Balla Union is 41.1% (Male-43%, Female-38.8%).

See also
 Union Councils of Tangail District

References

Populated places in Tangail District
Unions of Kalihati Upazila